The Tenaru is the name of a river on the northern coast of Guadalcanal with a tributary at Ironbottom Sound (called Savo Sound prior to World War II).  During World War II, it was the site for the Battle of the Tenaru River.

References

Guadalcanal
Rivers of the Solomon Islands